IN TV is an Albanian private television network dedicated to the young audience. It was launched on 16 June 2014 as MAD Albania, a music channel. MAD Albania won the prize of "The Best Albanian Music Channel" at the IMA Awards 2015. Since 29 December 2015 the channel is known as IN TV, and it changed its programming into a general channel.

IN has become one of the fastest-growing and most influential properties in the Albanian media. IN delivers, with its original programming, breaking social and entertainment news, in-depth coverage on celebrities, television, society, movies, music, fashion, beauty and lifestyle – everything in the pop culture of our times. It's the leading entertainment brand across social media platforms with thousands of loyal followers. 
The company is also heralded for its groundbreaking events.

Programming

Original programs
 3JAT
 Adrenalinë
 Balkan Trip
 Blender
 CineFun
 CineLove
 CineMania
 Dream Lab
 EuroBeat
 Fun Day
 Gossip Girl
 IN Axhenda
 IN da Hood
 IN Documentaries
 IN Life
 IN News 
 IN Report
 IN Style 
 IN Topic
 INstaBuzz
 Kafe IN
 Kripë dhe Piper
 Life Stories
 LIKE Shqip
 Morning Tunes
 Një kat më lart
 People's Voice
 Kolaudim
 Retrovision
 Rock Top
 Sweet Lab
 Trokit
 Then and Now
 Time Machine
 Vip Room
 Zoom IN

TV Series

See also
 Television in Albania

References

External links
Official Website
YouTube Channel

Television networks in Albania
Mass media in Tirana